Talk shows are highlighted in  yellow, local programming is white, reruns of prime-time programming are orange, game shows are pink, soap operas are chartreuse, news programs are gold and all others are light blue. New series are highlighted in bold.

All Monday–Friday Shows for all networks beginning in September 1949. In many cases, during hours when "Local Programming"is listed, stations may have been running test patterns or might have been off the air.

NOTE: This page is missing info on the DuMont Network, which started daytime transmission before any other United States television network.

Fall 1949

Winter 1949-1950

Spring 1950

Summer 1950

By network

ABC

New Series
Mr. Magic and J.J.

Not Returning From 1948-49
Cartoon Teletales
The Singing Lady

CBS

Returning Series
The Chuck Wagon
Classifield Column
The Ted Steele Show
The U.N. in Action
Vanity Fair

New Series
Homemaker's Exchange
U.N. General Assembly Sessions

Not Returning From 1948-49
The Adventures of Lucky Pup
Ladies Day
These Are My Children
Western Balladeer

NBC

Returning Series
Howdy Doody

New Series
Cactus Jim
Henson Baldwin's War News Digest
Judy Splinters

Not Returning From 1948-49
Here's Archer
These Are My Children
Western Balladeer

Dumont

Returning series
Okay, Mother
TV Shopper

Not Returning From 1948-49
Amanda
Camera Headlines
Johnny Olson's Rumpus Room
The Magic Cottage
Man in the Street
Russ Hodges' Scoreboard
The Stan Shaw Show
TV Shopper
Vincent Lopez Speaking
The Wendy Barrie Show
A Woman to Remember

See also
1949-50 United States network television schedule (prime-time)

Sources
https://web.archive.org/web/20071015122215/http://curtalliaume.com/abc_day.html
https://web.archive.org/web/20071015122235/http://curtalliaume.com/cbs_day.html
https://web.archive.org/web/20071012211242/http://curtalliaume.com/nbc_day.html

United States weekday network television schedules
1949 in American television
1950 in American television